Free Yourself is the debut studio album released in 1977 by the Washington, D.C.-based go-go band Experience Unlimited.

Track listing

Side A
"It's All Imagination" – 3:26
"Functus" – 4:51
"Peace Gone Away" – 4:47
"Free Yourself" – 8:03

Side B
"Hey You" – 3:40
"People" – 6:10
"Funky Consciousness" – 9:08

Personnel
 Gregory "Sugar Bear" Elliott – lead vocals, bass guitar
 Anthony "Block" Easton – drums
 Andre "Pops" Lucas – congas, percussions
 Michael "Professeur Funk" Hughes – keyboards
 Phillip Harris – trumpet
 Clarence "Oscar" Smith – saxophone
 Greyline T. Hunter – trombone

References

External links
...Free Yourself at Discogs

1977 debut albums
Experience Unlimited albums
Jazz-funk albums